Georgia participated in the 2019 European Games held in Minsk from 21 to 30 June 2019. Georgia was represented by 61 athletes in 11 sports in these competitions.

Archery

Recurve

Boxing

Men

Canoeing

Sprint

Men

Badri Kavelashvili
Zaza Nadiradze

Women

Mariam Kerdikashvili

Cycling

Men

See also
	
 List of multi-sport events
 Sport in Georgia

References

Nations at the 2019 European Games
European Games
2019